Fyodor Olegovich was the Grand Prince of Ryazan (1402–1427) and son of Grand Prince Oleg II of Ryazan.

References

1360 births
1427 deaths
Grand Princes of Ryazan
Eastern Orthodox monarchs
14th-century monarchs in Europe
15th-century monarchs in Europe
Rurikids